Sammy Hagar (also known as the Red Rocker) is an American singer-songwriter, musician, and entrepreneur. In a career spanning over 40 years. He started his musical career and rose to prominence during the early 1970s as the lead vocalist for the American hard rock band Montrose, Hagar then left Montrose in the mid-1970s and embraced a solo career recording and releasing his debut album Nine on a Ten Scale (1976). Hagar has since then kept a successful solo career smashing a hit in 1984 with "I Can't Drive 55", shortly before joining the American hard rock band Van Halen.

Hagar is also known for having associated and being a member of numerous rock bands.

Studio albums anthology

This list chronologically displays solo and band studio albums.

Montrose

Studio albums

Singles

Compilations 
Hagar was in Montrose from 1973 to 1975. Montrose's compilation include songs featuring Bob James who recorded with the band from 1975 to 1976 and Johnny Edwards who sang for the band in 1987. Consequently, not all songs on this album feature Hagar or his songwriting.

Solo and Sammy Hagar & The Waboritas

The Waboritas (also known as "The Wabos") is a backing band Hagar uses on some of his albums, but he tends to still refer to these as solo albums so they have been kept together. On compilation albums, often no distinction is made between Hagar's solo work and his work with the Waboritas so none has been made here.

Studio albums 

Note: I Never Said Goodbye was originally named Sammy Hagar but was renamed after an MTV competition where a fan got to pick a name for the album.

Live albums

Compilations
{| class="wikitable" style="text-align:center;"
! Album
! Year
! Chart (USA)
! RIAA (USA)
! Release period covered
! Newly released tracks
|-
| align=left|Rematch || 1982 || 171 || — || 1976–1980 || No
|-
| align=left|Crusin' & Boozin'''|| 1984 || — || — || 1976–1980 || No
|-
| align=left|Red Hot! || 1989 || — || — || 1976–1980 || No
|-
| align=left|The Best of Sammy Hagar || 1992 || — || — || 1976–1980 || No
|-
| align=left|Turn Up the Music! || 1993 || — || — || 1976–1980 || No
|-
| align=left|Unboxed || 1994 || 51 || Gold || 1981–1987 || 2 songs
|-
| align=left|The Anthology || 1994 || — || — || 1973–1984 || No
|-
| align=left|The Best of Sammy Hagar || 1999 || — || — || 1977–1979 || No
|-
| align=left|Masters of Rock || 2001 || — || — || 1976–1980 || No
|-
| align=left|Classic Masters || 2002 || — || — || 1977–1980 || No
|-
| align=left|The Essential Red Collection || 2004 || 75 || — || 1973–1999 || 2 songs
|-
| align=left|This Is Sammy Hagar: When the Party Started Volume 1 || 2016 || — || — || 1999–2006 || 2 songs
|-
|}

 Singles 

Music videos

Video releases
 Cabo Wabo Birthday Bash Tour (2001)
 The Long Road To Cabo (2003)
 Sammy and The Wabos: Livin' It Up In St. Louis (2007)
Go There Once, Be There Twice (2010) [Unreleased]

Guest appearances

Hagar Schon Aaronson Shrieve

 Live album 

 Singles 

Van Halen (1985–1996, 2004)

 Studio albums 

 Live albums 

 Compilations 
Hagar was in Van Halen from 1985 to 1996 and 2004. Both of Van Halen's compilation albums also include songs featuring current lead vocalist David Lee Roth who recorded with the band from 1974 to 1985. He returned in 1996 for the first best of album that went #1 on Billboard''. He then returned in 2006 and is still a member, touring with them in 2007, 2008, 2012, 2013 and 2015. Consequently, not all songs on these albums feature Hagar or his songwriting.

Singles

Video releases

with The Hagar/Hart Project

Singles

Chickenfoot

Studio album

Live albums

Singles

Sammy Hagar and the Circle

Studio albums

Live albums

Singles

Music videos

References

Discography
Discographies of American artists
Rock music discographies